Anatoli Stepanovich Ivanov (May 5, 1928 – May 31, 1999) was a Soviet and Russian writer known for his novels on rural topics.

Ivanov was born on in the village of Shemonaikha (now in the East Kazakhstan Region of Kazakhstan). His parents, Marfa Loginovna and Stepan Ivanov, came from peasant farming families, but he was not involved in the farm, living in the district center where his father worked as head of the district department of Soyuzpechat'. In 1946-1950 he studied at the journalism faculty of Kazakh State University. His creative activity began in 1948 as a journalist in the newspaper Priirtyshskaya pravda (Semipalatinsk), served in the military, then was the editor of the regional newspaper Leninskoe znamya in the Novosibirsk Oblast. From 1954 he began to publish stories; his first collection was Alkiny pesni (Alka's songs, 1958). In 1958-1964 he was deputy editor of the magazine Sibirskie ogni. In the late 1960s he moved to Moscow. The main themes of his works are the revolution in the Siberian villages, collectivization, and World War II.

Two of his novels were filmed. Eternal Call  was the base of the TV series with the same name. Another TV series was based on his novel Shadows Disappear at Noon (:ru:Тени исчезают в полдень). The two novels are represented in a monument at the author's birthplace Shemonaikha. Ivanov was a Hero of Socialist Labour and recipient of many other awards.

References

External links
 А. С. Иванов в энциклопедии «Кругосвет»
 

1928 births
1999 deaths
20th-century Russian male writers
20th-century Russian screenwriters
Communist Party of the Soviet Union members
Eleventh convocation members of the Supreme Soviet of the Soviet Union
Heroes of Socialist Labour
Recipients of the Lenin Komsomol Prize
Recipients of the Order of Lenin
Recipients of the Order of the Red Banner of Labour
Recipients of the USSR State Prize
Socialist realism writers
Russian editors
Russian male writers
Russian screenwriters
Soviet editors
Soviet male writers
Soviet screenwriters
Burials at Novodevichy Cemetery
Molodaya Gvardiya (magazine) editors